Jerzy Głowacki (26 June 1950 – 11 January 2022) was a Polish cyclist. He competed in the team pursuit event at the 1972 Summer Olympics.

He died in Albuquerque on 11 January 2022, at the age of 71.

References

External links
 

1950 births
2022 deaths
Polish male cyclists
Olympic cyclists of Poland
Cyclists at the 1972 Summer Olympics
Sportspeople from Kalisz